Calgary-Shaw is a provincial electoral district in Alberta, Canada. The district is one of 87 current districts mandated to return a single member to the Legislative Assembly of Alberta using the first past the post method of voting.

This urban riding was created from parts of Calgary-Fish Creek and Calgary-Glenmore in the 1986 boundary redistribution. It covers the central southern portion of city of Calgary, and has seen its borders change numerous times since it was created. The riding in its current boundaries contains the neighbourhoods of Shawnessy, Somerset, Silverado, Chaparral, Walden and Legacy.

The riding was named after former Liberal leader Joseph Tweed Shaw.

History
The electoral district was created in the 1986 boundary redistribution from the south end of Calgary-Glenmore and the west half of Calgary-Fish Creek. Over the years the riding boundaries have caused the riding to shift southward from its original boundaries.

The 2003 boundary redistribution caused the riding to be split east of the Bow River into the electoral district of Calgary-Hays.

The 2010 boundary redistribution saw all land south of Alberta Highway 22X move into the electoral district of Calgary-South East. The west boundaries with Calgary-Lougheed were altered in the northwest corner to gain land in the community of Millrise and the Shawnee Slopes golf course from Lougheed.

Boundary history

Representation history

The electoral district was created in the 1986 boundary redistribution. The election that year saw Progressive Conservative candidate Jim Dinning win with a landslide majority. He ran for a second term in the 1989 general election and won a bigger popular vote but his percentage decreased.

The 1993 boundary redistribution changed the boundaries for Calgary-Shaw. Dinning ran in the new electoral district of Calgary-Lougheed for the 1993 election and won. The election in this district saw former Calgary alderman Jon Havelock run as the Progressive Conservative candidate and win a landslide. He won his second term in the 1997 general election with an even bigger landslide taking 78% of the popular vote. He retired from provincial office at dissolution of the legislature in 2001.

The 2001 general election saw Progressive Conservative candidate Cindy Ady win the largest majority in Alberta history. She became the first candidate to top 20,000 votes and took over 80%. She ran for a second term in office in the 2004 general election. She lost almost 14,000 voters from 2001 but still took the district with 63%.

Premier Ed Stelmach appointed Ady in 2007 to the cabinet with the junior portfolio of Associate Minister of Tourism Promotion. She was promoted to be a full minister in 2008. Ady was re-elected to her third term in the 2008 general election taking just over half the popular vote.

In the 2012 general election Jeff Wilson of the Wildrose Party was elected.  In 2014 Jeff Wilson left the Wildrose Party and crossed the floor of the Alberta Legislature to sit with the Progressive Conservative Party.

In the 2015 general election Graham Sucha of the New Democratic Party was elected with 31% of the vote.

Legislature results

Elections in the 1980s

Elections in the 1990s

Elections in the 2000s

Elections in the 2010s

Senate nominee results

2004 Senate nominee election district results

Voters had the option of selecting 4 Candidates on the Ballot

2012 Senate nominee election district results

Student Vote results

On November 19, 2004 a Student Vote was conducted at participating Alberta schools to parallel the 2004 Alberta general election results. The vote was designed to educate students and simulate the electoral process for persons who have not yet reached the legal majority. The vote was conducted in 80 of the 83 provincial electoral districts with students voting for actual election candidates. Schools with a large student body that reside in another electoral district had the option to vote for candidates outside of the electoral district then where they were physically located.

2012 election

References

External links 
Electoral Divisions Act 2003
 Demographics for Calgary Shaw
Riding Map for Calgary Shaw
Website of the Legislative Assembly of Alberta
Student Vote Alberta

Alberta provincial electoral districts
Politics of Calgary